Black and White in Color (then Noirs et Blancs en couleur for the 1977 re-issue) is a French-Ivorian 1976 war film and black comedy directed by Jean-Jacques Annaud in his directorial debut. The film is set in the African theater of World War I, during the French invasion of the German colony of Kamerun. The film adopts a strong antimilitaristic point of view, and is noteworthy for ridiculing the French side even more harshly than their German counterparts.

The original French title is the first four words (the first line) of the song Le Chant du départ, a French military song.

It won the 1976 Academy Award for Best Foreign Language Film; it was submitted to the Académie de Côte d'Ivoire, resulting in that country's first and only Oscar.

Cast
Jean Carmet as Sergeant Bosselet 
Jacques Dufilho as Paul Rechampot 
Catherine Rouvel as Marinette 
Jacques Spiesser as Hubert Fresnoy 
Maurice Barrier as Caprice 
Benjamin Memel Atchory

Reception
John Simon described Black and White in Color as an "absolute gem". Roger Ebert gave Black and White in Color three out of a possible four stars writing- "is fun to watch and pointed in its comments on race and colonialism"

See also
 African theatre of World War I
 List of submissions to the 49th Academy Awards for Best Foreign Language Film
 List of Ivorian submissions for the Academy Award for Best Foreign Language Film

References

External links 
 

1976 films
1970s black comedy films
1970s war comedy-drama films
French war comedy-drama films
Ivorian comedy films
1970s French-language films
French black comedy films
Military humor in film
World War I films set in Africa
Anti-war films about World War I
Films set in Africa
Films set in Cameroon
Best Foreign Language Film Academy Award winners
Films directed by Jean-Jacques Annaud
Films produced by Jacques Perrin
Films shot in Ivory Coast
1976 directorial debut films
Films set in 1915
1976 in Ivory Coast
1970s French films